The Hazael horse frontlet is a bronze horse frontlet discovered at the Heraion of Samos, inscribed in Phoenician characters for Hazael (proposed by scholars to be the same as Hazael of Aram Damascus). It is considered to have been made in North Syria, perhaps at Arslan Tash.

The inscription is known as KAI 311.

Discovery and description

It was found in 1984 at the Heraion of Samos. It is 27.3cm long.

On its left side it has a single line of inscription, which can be read horizontally when the artefact is rotated by approx. 120 degrees. The text is 16 cm long and consists of 36 characters that are between 3-9mm high.

References

Phoenician inscriptions
Archaeological artifacts
KAI inscriptions